Thomas de Thelwall (died 1382) was an English judge and Crown official who spent part of his career in Ireland, where he held office as Master of the Rolls in Ireland and Clerk to the Privy Council of Ireland. He was Chancellor of the Duchy of Lancaster 1377–78.

Little is known of his early life; his surname suggests that he was a native of Thelwall, Cheshire. He is first heard of as a Clerk in the Royal Chancery in about 1360. He became parish priest of Polebrook in Northamptonshire in 1361.

In 1369 he accompanied Sir  William de Windsor, the new Lord Lieutenant, to Ireland; he became Master of the Rolls in 1372, at a fee of £20, and a prebendary of St Patrick's Cathedral, Dublin. Otway-Ruthven describes him in 1374 as Clerk to the Irish Privy Council, one of the first men to have held this office. The Patent Roll records an extra payment of 5 marks to Thelwall in 1372 for carrying the Rolls to the Lord Deputy of Ireland and the Council at Cork.

He returned to England about 1375 and was appointed Chancellor of the Duchy of Lancaster in 1377, but held office for only a year. He is thought to have died in 1382.

References

Chancellors of the Duchy of Lancaster
People from Cheshire
1382 deaths
Year of birth unknown
Masters of the Rolls in Ireland